Ilias Kelesidis (20 June 1953 – 30 March 2007) was a Greek cyclist. He competed in the individual road race event at the 1984 Summer Olympics.

References

External links
 

1953 births
2007 deaths
Greek male cyclists
Panathinaikos cyclists
Olympic cyclists of Greece
Cyclists at the 1984 Summer Olympics
Sportspeople from Brno
20th-century Greek people